The Stabat Mater is a musical setting of the Stabat Mater sequence, composed by Luigi Boccherini in 1781 (G.532a) and revised in 1800 (G.532b, Op.61).

Boccherini (1743–1805) was a musician best known for chamber music (string quintets). His vocal work is played less often. He worked as a cantatrice and wrote numerous religious works (including one mass, two motets and two oratorios).

His Stabat Mater was a command passed in 1781, when was patroned by the King of Spain's younger brother Luis of Spain, Count of Chinchón. It was conceived for a liturgical service at Palacio de la Mosquera, Arenas de San Pedro, where they were living. The text is a text dating from the 13th century and attributed to Jacopone da Todi which meditates on the suffering of Mary during the crucifixion. The first version consisted of one soprano voice accompanied by a string quintet (two violins, one viola, two cellos). It consists of 11 parts and lasts around three-quarters of an hour. The musician rewrote it around twenty years later (in 1801) when he added an overture for two voices: a contralto and a tenor. The definitive work is known as opus 61 of the musician.

 Stabat mater dolorosa, Grave assai
 Cujus animam gementem, Allegro
 Quae moerebat et dolebat, Allegretto con moto
 Quis est homo, Adagio assai – Recitativo
 Pro peccatis suae gentis, Allegretto
 Eja mater, fons amoris, Larghetto non tanto
 Tui nati vulnerati, Allegro vivo
 Virgo virginum praeclara, Andantino
 Fac ut portem Christi mortem, Larghetto
 Fac me plagis vulnerari, Allegro comodo
 Quando corpus morietur, Andante lento

Bibliography 
 Luca Lévi Sala, Édition critique du "Stabat Mater" de Luigi Boccherini, PhD Dissertation, 2 Vols., UFR Sciences Humaines et Arts, Université de Poitiers (France), 2012, pp. xxii-188+404.
 Luca Lévi Sala, 'Luigi Boccherini, Stabat Mater (2 versions) G 532', Bologna, Ut Orpheus Edizioni (Opera Omnia, Italian National Edition under the Direction of Christian Speck, pp. cxxxviii+190, ISMN 979-0-2153-2378-0, .
 Luca Lévi Sala, Luigi Boccherini, Stabat Mater in F minor G 532 for Soprano, 2 Violins, Viola, Violoncello and Basso, Practical Edition, Bologna, Ut Orpheus Edizioni (PEB 37A), 2015, pp. x-91, ISMN 979-0-2153-2311-7.
 Luca Lévi Sala, 'Le Stabat Mater (1781) de Luigi Boccherini : nouveaux témoignages sur le manuscrit M. 2103.3 B 65 de la Bibliothèque du Congrès de Washington', in Boccherini Studies: New Evidence, Christian Speck (ed.), Bologna, Ut Orpheus Edizioni, 2014 (BS, 4), pp. 95–117, .
 Luca Lévi Sala, 'Le manuscrit espagnol I-Li PI 233 du Stabat Mater Op. 61 de Luigi Boccherini : ce que les sources nous dissent', in Boccherini Studies: New Evidence, Christian Speck (ed.), Bologna, Ut Orpheus Edizioni, 2014 (BS, 4), pp. 119–139, .
 Luca Lévi Sala, 'Le Stabat Mater Op. 61 (1801) de Luigi Boccherini : genèse et état des sources', in Revue de Musicologie, vol. 100 (2014/2), Paris, Société française de musicologie, pp. 323–356, .
 Luca Lévi Sala, 'Deux manuscrits inconnus du Stabat Mater Op. 61 de Luigi Boccherini', in Quatre siècles d’édition musicale. Mélanges offerts à Jean Gribenski (Études de Musicologie/Musicological Studies 5), Joann Élart, Etienne Jardin and Patrick Taïeb (eds.), Basel, Peter Lang, 2014, pp. 147–155, .
 Luca Lévi Sala, 'Le fonti secondarie francesi dello Stabat Mater Op. 61 di Luigi Boccherini: due manoscritti inediti', in Die wiener Klassiker und das Italien ihrer Zeit, Petra Weber (ed.), Munich, Fink, 2015, pp. 217–226, .

Discography  
 Stabat Mater, (1781 G. 532 version), Barbara Vignudelli (soprano), Flavio Emilio Scogna (conductor), Benedetto Marcello Chamber Orchestra, Tactus TC 740208 - 2006.
 Stabat Mater — Ensemble symposium, Francesca Boncompagni (2016, Brilliant Classics, 95356). Performance based on the Critical Edition prepared by Luca Lévi Sala (Bologna: Ut Orpheus, 2015).
 Stabat Mater – Roberta Invernizzi, L'Archibudelli (2003, Sony SK 89 926)
 Stabat Mater (1781 version) – Agnès Melon (soprano), Ensemble 415, Dir. Chiara Banchini (1992, Harmonia Mundi HM 901378)
 Stabat Mater – Isabel Rey (soprano), JONDE, dir. Riccardo Frizza, DECCA

References

Boccherini
Compositions by Luigi Boccherini
1781 compositions
Compositions in F minor